The 1974–75 Boston Bruins season was the Bruins' 51st season in the NHL.

Offseason

Regular season
On December 22, 1974, Phil Esposito scored the 500th goal of his career.

Divisional standings

Schedule and results

Playoffs

Player statistics

Regular season
Scoring

Goaltending

Playoffs
Scoring

Goaltending

Awards and records

Records

Milestones

Transactions

Trades

Free agents

Claimed from waivers

Draft picks

See also
1974–75 NHL season

Farm teams

References

 Bruins on Hockey Database

Boston Bruins seasons
Boston Bruins
Boston Bruins
Boston Bruins
Boston Bruins
Bruins
Bruins